Hapoel Gilboa Galil is a professional basketball club that is based in north-east Israel. The club plays its home game in the Israeli Basketball Premier League (the top tier of Israeli basketball) in a 2,250-seat arena in Gan Ner.

History
The club was founded in 2008 after Hapoel Gilboa (which had previously been merged with Hapoel Afula, which regained its independence) receive the top-division license in the Israeli Basketball Premier League of Hapoel Galil Elyon. 

Initially it was believed to be a merger agreement, as they originally planned to play 70% of the club's home domestic league games at Gan Ner Sports Hall in Gan Ner (a village of 2,700 people near Mount Gilboa, in the Galilee in northern Israel) and 30% of their home domestic league games in Hapoel Galil Elyon's arena in Kfar Blum. But the agreement never came to fruition as Hapoel Galil Elyon rejected the merger, and all of the club's home domestic league games were played in Gan Ner, essentially making them a new team. Galil Elyon was re-established in 2009, as a lower-division team.

In May 2010, Hapoel Gilboa Galil won the Israeli Championship, after defeating defending champions Maccabi Tel Aviv by a score of 90–77 in the finals of the playoffs.

In the summer of 2018, the club had financial difficulties, and a large part of it was purchased by fans.

Current roster

Honors

Total titles: 3

Domestic competitions
Israeli Championships
Winners (1): 2010
Runners-up (1): 2011

Regional competitions
Balkan League
Winners (2): 2012, 2013
Runners-up (1): 2014

Notable players

 
  Dagan Yivzori 5 seasons: '08-'13
  Brian Roberts 1 season: '08-'09
  Elishay Kadir 2 seasons: '08-'10
  Brian Randle 2 seasons: '08-'10
  Dion Dowell 2 seasons: '08-'10
  Gal Mekel 3 seasons: '08-'11
  Guni Israeli 3 seasons: '08-'11
  Avishay Gordon 4 seasons: '08-'12
  Jeremy Pargo 1 season: '09-'10
  Isaiah Swann 1 season: '09-'10
  Tyler Wilkerson 1 season: '10-'11
  Marco Killingsworth 1 season: '10-'11
  Ido Kozikaro 2 seasons: '10-'12
  Romeo Travis 1 season: '11-'12
  Courtney Fells 1 season: '11-'12
  Joseph Jones 1 season: '11-'12
  Jan Martín 1 season: '11-'12
  Nimrod Tishman 3 seasons: '11-'14
  Mitchell Watt 1 season: '12-'13
  Jamar Smith 1 season: '12-'13
  Rakim Sanders 1 season: '12-'13
  Yaniv Green 2 seasons: '12-'14
  Amit Simhon 2 seasons: '12-'14
  Joaquin Szuchman 7 seasons: '12-'19
  Mike James 1 season: '13
  Adrian Banks 1 season: '13
  Stu Douglass 1 season: '13-'14
  DeShawn Sims 1 season: '13-'14
  Kenny Boynton 1 season: '13-'14
  Gerald Robinson 1 season: '13-'14
  Alex Young 1 season: '14-'15
  Oded Brandwein 1 season: '14-'15
  Rafi Menco 1 season: '14-'15
  Itay Segev 1 season: '14-'15
  Demetrius Treadwell 1 season: '15-'16
  Jason Siggers 2 seasons: '15-'17
  Eric Griffin 1 season: '16-'17
  Murphy Holloway 1 season: '16-'17
  Tal Karpelesz 3 seasons: '16-'19
  Ezequiel Skverer 3 seasons: '16-'19
  J'Covan Brown 1 season: '17-'18
  Zach LeDay 1 season: '17-'18
  D'Angelo Harrison 1 season: '17-'18
  Bryant Crawford 1 season: '18-'19
  Ian Miller 1 season: '18-'19
  Greg Whittington 1 season: '18-'19
  James Kelly 1 season: '18-'19

References

External links
Club website 

Gilboa Galil
Basketball teams established in 2008
2008 establishments in Israel
Gilboa Galil
Israeli Basketball Premier League teams